The Indiana Derby is a Grade III American Thoroughbred horse race for three-year-olds run over a distance of  miles on the dirt held annually in July at Horseshoe Indianapolis in Shelbyville, Indiana. It is the racetrack's signature event offering its current highest purse at $300,000.

History

The event was inaugurated on 7 October 1995 at Hoosier Park and was won by Dogwood Stable's Peruvian who was the second part of trainer Peter Vestal's entry in a time of 1:43 flat on a fast track.

The event was upgraded to Grade III in 2002 and in 2004 to Grade II. It held this classification until 2017 when the event was downgraded back to Grade III.

The dead heat in the 2006 running was the first dead heat for the Indiana Derby. The result was contested by the owners of Star Dabbler who came out of the race injured. They believed he won the race so took the issue to arbitration but the result was upheld.

The 2009 win by Misremembered set a new track record. 
2010 marked a groundbreaking year for the Indiana Derby and racing in the state of Indiana when Lookin At Lucky became the first winner of a Triple Crown race ever to race in the state of Indiana. Sent off at odds of 2–5, Lookin At Lucky won the race by 1 lengths in last-to-first fashion much to the delight of the ontrack crowd.

In 2013 the event was moved to Indiana Grand, now known as Horseshoe Indianapolis. Since 2015, the race has been held in July.

Bob Baffert became the first trainer to win the race two years in a row in 2009 and 2010 with Misremembered and Lookin At Lucky. He won his third Indiana Derby with Power Broker in 2013, and his fourth with Cupid in 2016.

In 2020 the event was run over the  miles distance however the following year this distance was reverted to  miles.

Records
Speed  record:
1:40.80 - Misremembered (2009)

Margins: 
 5 lengths –  Irap (2017)

Most wins by a jockey:
 3 - Robby Albarado (1998, 2001, 2007)

Most wins by a trainer:
 4 - Bob Baffert (2009, 2010, 2013, 2016)

Most wins by an owner:
 No owner has won this race more than once.

Winners

Notes:

§ Ran as part of an entry

See also
List of American and Canadian Graded races

External links
 Hoosier Park's official site

References

Graded stakes races in the United States
Horse races in Indiana
Flat horse races for three-year-olds
Recurring sporting events established in 1995
1995 establishments in Indiana
Grade 3 stakes races in the United States